Vriesea noblickii is a plant species in the genus Vriesea. This species is endemic to Brazil.

References

noblickii
Flora of Brazil